Walter De Brouwer (born May 9, 1957) is a Belgian-born internet and technology serial entrepreneur and semiotician. He is the former CEO of doc.ai and of Scanadu.  As a serial entrepreneur, as of 2013, he took part in the creation of over 35 companies, including two that became publicly traded through Initial Public Offering.

Early life and education 

De Brouwer, born in Aalst, Belgium, is now an American citizen. He earned a Master's degree in linguistics from the University of Ghent and a PhD in Semiotics from Tilburg University.  He was a fellow of the Centre for Entrepreneurial Learning at Judge Business School at the University of Cambridge from 2004 until 2010.

Teaching and board memberships
He was a lecturer at the University of Antwerp (UFSIA) and faculty professor at the University of Monaco. He is an adjunct professor at Stanford University Medical school (the Clinical Excellence Research Center).

He was on the editorial advisory board of the Journal for Chinese Entrepreneurship. De Brouwer is a member of the American Mathematical Society.

Former member of the Tau Zero Foundation (until 2013). 
He is now co-chairing the IEEE committee on Decentralized Clinical Trials. and a member of the board of Linux Foundation Public Health together with IBM, CISCO, Tencent, VMWare

Career

Publisher 
De Brouwer set up Riverland Publications in 1990 to publish personal computer magazines. In 1994, he sold his titles to VNU. He then published the cyberpunk magazine Wave, edited by Michel Bauwens and designed by Niels Shoe Meulman. Wave was a cult Belgian avant garde magazine.

Internet 

In 1996, De Brouwer was one of the founders of EUnet. Eunet was sold to Qwest Communications in 1999. He founded the employment website Jobscape. In 2008, De Brouwer set up OLPC Europe, the European branch of One Laptop per Child.

Starlab 

In 1996, De Brouwer founded Starlab together with MIT Media Lab founder Nicholas Negroponte. Under De Brouwer’s direction, by April 2001 it had hired 70 scientists from 33 different countries. Starlab went bankrupt in June 2001.

Scanadu 

De Brouwer is co-founder and former CEO of Scanadu, a company located at the NASA Ames Research Park in California. and Scanaflo, an at-home, full-panel urinalysis testing device designed to give consumers immediate information about their liver health, urinary tract infections, and other vitals. Scanadu was taken over by healthy.io (in 2020)

Doc.ai 
De Brouwer stepped down from CEO of Scanadu in April 2016 and became a co-founder (along with his wife, Sam de Brouwer) and the original CEO of doc.ai., a Palo Alto, CA-based artificial intelligence company with a focus on digital healthcare, including an app to help patients manage and analyze health data. In 2020, he stepped down as CEO and was replaced by Sam De Brouwer (née Lounis); he stayed on with the company as chief scientific officer. Doc.ai was acquired in January 2021 by the Atlanta-based digital health company Sharecare, who brought Walter De Brouwer onto their board as chief science officer as part of the merger. Doc.ai was featured in Forbes when the company received a $100m contract from Anthem, the second-largest insurer in USA.

Snowcrash 

In March 2022, de Brouwer co-founded Snowcrash, with backing from Sony Music and Universal Music Group, a platform for trading NFTs from musicians, with initial offerings from Bob Dylan and Miles Davis. De Brouwer’s co-founders at Snowcrash are Jesse Dylan, a son of Bob Dylan, and Jeff Rosen.

Other activities
De Brouwer is a Fellow of the Royal Society of Arts and served as President of RSA Europe from 2006 to 2008. He is a member of TED. He was a distinguished lecturer at the National Science Foundation in 2013.

De Brouwer's articles have been published by VentureBeat, The Huffington Post, Techonomy, and others. His article, “How the People Are Taking Over the World,” was among Techonomy's Most-Read Articles of 2014 and was cited by its editors as “perhaps the most philosophical of Techonomy’s top articles” that year.
De Brouwer held 13 European utility patents and 11 design patents that were sold to Philips in 2001 and are now expired.  He was awarded 7 active patents and submitted another 22 provisional patents in the USA and 2 in China and Japan.

Bibliography
 De Brouwer, Walter. Notes & Queries: Mary Imlay, Analytical Review (Oxford, 1982), 29:204-206.
 De Brouwer, Walter. Notes & Queries: Joshua Toulmin, Analytical Review (Oxford, 1983), 30:209-212.
 De Brouwer, Walter; Ayris, Stephen (1985). Computer Buzz words : Teacher's guide. Wolters Leuven, 
 De Brouwer, Walter (1985). Cybercrud : computer terminology for advanced students of informatics and industrial engineering. Wolters Leuven, 
 Vanneste, Alex; Geens D, De Brouwer, Walter (1987). Het Nieuwe Landschap, Wolters Leuven, 
 De Brouwer, Walter (2004). Echelon: Three can keep a Secret, if Two of them are Dead. Delaware, ASIN B004J3UHGG
 De Brouwer, Walter (2004). The biology of language: the post-modern deconstruction and denarration of modern and pre-modern grand narratives. Universiteit van Tilburg, 
De Brouwer, W., Patel, C.J., Manrai, A.K. et al. Empowering clinical research in a decentralized world. npj Digital Medicine 4, 102 (2021).

References

External links
 "I. Am. The Greatest" article by Walter De Brouwer.
 "How the People Are Taking Over the World" article by Walter De Brouwer.
 "Medical Devices Allow You to Check Vitals at Home" Wall Street Journal D Live Conference video interview.

Semioticians
Nanotechnologists
Futurologists
Living people
1957 births
People from Aalst, Belgium